The Notorious Lone Wolf (1946) is the twelfth Lone Wolf film produced by Columbia Pictures. The picture features Gerald Mohr in his inaugural performance as the protagonist detective Lone Wolf, Janis Carter, and Ian Wolfe as Adam Wainwright, the film's antagonist. The film was directed by D. Ross Lederman and written by Martin Berkeley, Edward Dein, and William J. Bowers.

The film centres on former jewel looter Michael Lanyard, also known by his alias "Lone Wolf", aiming to clear his name after he is accused of murdering a bar dancer. At the same time, he races to retrieve a stolen piece of jewellery. Filming took place in October and November 1945. The Notorious Lone Wolf was theatrically released in the United States in February 1946.

Plot
Having left the Army, reformed jewel thief and current detective Michael Lanyard (Gerald Mohr), or the Lone Wolf, returns to New York from England to find his lover Carla Winter (Janis Carter). On the way, he is tipped off by Inspector Crane (William Davidson) of the looting of the Shalimar, a diamond co-owned by the Prince of Rapur (Olaf Hytten) and Lal Bara (John Abbott). It is revealed that the jewel thief is Stonely (Don Beddoe), owner of a bar.

Meanwhile, Winter's sister Rita (Adelle Roberts) requests Lanyard's help. Her husband, Dick Hale (Robert Scott), has been cheating on his wife and is having an intimate affair with Lilli (Virginia Hunter), a performer at Stonely's bar. The Lone Wolf and Hale go to the bar together, only to find Lilli murdered. Lanyard is pinpointed by the suspicious police as the perpetrator. He manages to escape and sets out to find the mastermind. Disguised as the Rapurian prince, Lanyard meets jeweller Adam Wainwright (Ian Wolfe), who promises to retrieve the stolen Shalimar in exchange for a promised reward.

Lanyard quickly receives news from Wainwright that he has found the looted piece of jewellery. However, it is swiped away by Stonely when Lanyard meets Wainwright at the latter's shop. The Lone Wolf alerts the police; both Stonely and Wainwright are caught, with the jeweller being found guilty of murdering Lilli. Lanyard returns home to Winter but their residence catches fire halfway into their love-making so as to end the intimacy in accordance with the prevailing censorship of the time.

Production
After a sickly Warren William decided to discontinue playing the title character Lone Wolf, Gerald Mohr was roped in by Columbia Pictures, the production company and the distributor, to replace William. Mohr had previously acted as a minor figure in One Dangerous Night (1943), the ninth Lone Wolf film. Eric Blore continued playing Lanyard's butler Jamison, his ninth time doing so, while Janis Carter acted as Lanyard's lover. A kissing scene between Carter's character and Mohr's one was described as "daring" for the time period it was made in.

While still a work-in-progress, the film was referred to as The Lone Wolf on Broadway. D. Ross Lederman served as director of the film. Ted Richmond was in charge of production for Columbia Pictures, while Martin Berkeley and Edward Dein wrote the screenplay based on a story by William J. Bowers. Burnett Guffey signed on as cinematographer. The set decorator was Frank Kramer. Mischa Bakaleinikoff headed the musical direction, and Richard Fantl edited the film. Principal photography officially began on October 22, 1945, and ended on November 5, 1945.

Release
The Notorious Lone Wolf opened in American cinemas in February 1946. A reviewer for the magazine Variety lauded the "high-polished routine material" by the "able cast". In evaluating the film in his 2012 book Columbia Pictures Movie Series, 1926—1955: The Harry Cohn Years, Gene Blottner expressed disappointment at most of the cast's acting skills. He wrote that the comedy in the film was "clumsy and forced" and it was only a "so-so effort in the renewal of the Lone Wolf series."

References

Bibliography

External links
 
 

1946 films
Films directed by D. Ross Lederman
1946 crime films
American crime films
Columbia Pictures films
American black-and-white films
The Lone Wolf films
1940s American films